Chileoptilia yaroella is a moth of the family Gracillariidae. It is known from Chile.

The larvae feed on Acacia macrantha. They feed on the flowers of their host plant. It lives inside the flowers, moving from one flower to the other. No mining stage was observed.

References

Gracillariidae
Gracillarioidea genera
Monotypic moth genera
Moths of South America
Endemic fauna of Chile